The Zhenetskyi Huk or the Huk waterfall is located on the Zhenets' river about 9 km from Tatariv village, Nadvirna Raion, Ivano-Frankivsk Oblast in western Ukraine. the waterfall's height is . Local residents named the waterfall Huk because of the noise that is heard from him.

Zhenetskyi Huk is located on the Carpathian National Park, Gorgany mountain ridge and on the tourist root to Mount Homiak.

See also
 Waterfalls of Ukraine

External links
 http://www.turystam.in.ua: 1 and 2

References 

Waterfalls of Ukraine